Al-Khatuniyya Madrasa can refer to:

 Al-Khatuniyya Madrasa (Jerusalem)
 Al-Khatuniyya Madrasa (Damascus)
 Al-Khatuniyya Madrasa (Tripoli, Lebanon)
 Hatuniye Madrasa, Karaman